The Museo de Arte del Tolima (MAT) is an art museum located in Ibagué, capital of the Tolima Department of Colombia. It features pieces of Colombian art and  contemporary Latin American art. The museum was founded  by the artists Dario Ortiz, Julio Cesar Cuitiva, Margareth Bonilla Morales, and others and opened its doors to the public in December 2003. It offers a significant permanent collection as well as educational program and cultural programs to its visitors.

Works of the permanent collection include Epifanio Garay, Ricardo Acevedo Bernal, Jesús Rafael Soto, Carlos Cruz-Díez, Leonora Carrington, Alejandro Obregón, Fernando Botero, Édgar Negret, Julio Fajardo, Dario Ortiz, José Bedia, Ricardo Borrero Álvarez, José María Espinoza, Armando Villegas, pieces from Colombian and Latin American artists.

References

External links
 Museum website

Art museums established in 2003
Art museums and galleries in Colombia
Contemporary art galleries in South America
Buildings and structures in Tolima Department
2003 establishments in Colombia
Tourist attractions in Tolima Department